Gedeon Chetvertinsky (secular name Grigory Zakharovich Svyatopolk-Chetvertinsky) was a Ruthenian prince and hierarch of the Eastern Orthodox Church. He was appointed by the Patriarch of Moscow to the rank of "Metropolitan of Kiev, Galicia and all Ruthenia". The appointment was on the recommendation of the Hetman of the Zaporizhian Host — Ivan Samoylovych.

Gedeon was born as Hryhoriy to the starosta of Racibórz Zachary Svyatopolk-Chetvertynsky and Regina Chrenicka in Volhynian Voivodeship, Polish–Lithuanian Commonwealth.

From 1660 to 1684 he was a bishop of Lutsk and Ostroh in Volhynia (today Volyn diocese).

In October 1685 he went to Moscow to be installed formally in the metropolis by Patriarch Joachim of Moscow. His decision to accept his installation from the Patriarchate of Moscow undermined the independence of the Orthodox Church in those parts of the Ruthenia lands that lay in the Polish-Lithuanian Commonwealth. The decision was schismatic and was not recognised by the Ecumenical Patriarchate of Constantinople. It was also opposed by many church leaders in Ukraine. He had two successors who were also styled "Metropolitan of Kiev, Halych and Little Russia": Varlaam (1690–1707) and Joasaph (1707–1718).

Gallery

See also
 Czetwertyński family
 Ukrainian Orthodox Church (Moscow Patriarchate)

External links
 Kramar, O. Patriarch-raider. The Ukrainian Week. 11 February 2011.
 Gedeon at the Orthodox Encyclopedia
 Also known as Hedeon at the Encyclopedia of Ukraine

1634 births
1690 deaths
People from Volyn Oblast
People from Volhynian Voivodeship
Metropolitans of Kiev and all Rus' (claimed or partially recognised)
First Hierarchs of the Ukrainian Orthodox Church (Moscow Patriarchate)
Czetwertyński
Eastern Orthodox bishops of Lutsk
Eastern Orthodox bishops in the Polish–Lithuanian Commonwealth